USS Collingsworth (APA/LPA-146) was a Haskell-class attack transport in service with the United States Navy from 1945 to 1946. She was scrapped in 1985.

History 
Collingsworth was launched 2 December 1944 by California Shipbuilding Corp., San Pedro, California, under a Maritime Commission contract; sponsored by Mrs. R. H. Moulton; acquired 27 February 1945 and commissioned the same day. The hull and engine are a standard Victory ship design, she was the 62nd (TR30) Victory ship hull built by CalShip in just 143 days.
 
After one cargo voyage to Pearl Harbor (8 May-4 June 1945), Collingsworth departed Seattle, Washington, 27 June and sailed by way of Saipan and Ulithi to Okinawa, arriving 12 August. She carried troops for the occupations of Inchon, Korea, and Chinwangtao and Tsingtao, China, until 28 November when she sailed with homeward-bound servicemen for Tacoma, Washington, arriving 19 December. She discharged her passengers and sailed for San Pedro, California, the Panama Canal and Norfolk, Virginia, arriving 28 February 1946.

Decommissioning and fate 
She was decommissioned there 17 March 1946 and transferred to the Maritime Commission 20 March 1946. She was laid up in the James River and sold for scrap on 15 April 1985.

References

External links 

 NavSource Online: Amphibious Photo Archive - APA / LPA-146 Collingsworth

Victory ships
Ships built in Los Angeles
Haskell-class attack transports
World War II amphibious warfare vessels of the United States
USS Collingsworth (APA-146)
1944 ships